Temiloluwa Adesodun (born July 12, 1997) is a Nigerian footballer who currently plays as a defender for Charleston Battery in the USL Championship.

Career

College
Adesodun played four years of college soccer at the College of Charleston between 2015 and 2018, where he made a total of 70 appearances for the Cougars and was named CAA All-Rookie team in 2015.

While at college, Adesodun had spells with USL Premier Development League side SC United Bantams in 2015 and 2017.

Professional
Adesodun signed with USL Championship side Charleston Battery on September 19, 2019. He signed a new deal on March 6, 2020, to stay with the team for their 2020 season. He went on to make his professional debut on August 19, 2020, as an 86th-minute substitute during a 3–0 with over North Carolina FC.

References

External links
USL Championship bio
Charleston Battery bio

1997 births
Living people
Nigerian footballers
Nigerian expatriate footballers
Expatriate soccer players in the United States
Association football defenders
SC United Bantams players
Charleston Battery players
People from Columbia, South Carolina
Soccer players from South Carolina
USL Championship players
USL League Two players
College of Charleston Cougars men's soccer players
21st-century Nigerian people